Redband trout are a group of three recognized subspecies of rainbow trout (Oncorhynchus mykiss).  They occur in three distinct regions in Pacific basin tributaries and endorheic basins in the western United States.  The three subspecies are the Columbia River redband trout (O. m. gairdneri), the McCloud River redband trout (O. m. stonei) and the Great Basin redband trout (O. m. newberrii).

The Columbia River redband trout is found in the Columbia River and its tributaries in Montana, Oregon, Washington and Idaho. Anadromous populations of  O. m. gairdneri are known as redband steelhead.  The McCloud River redband trout is found in small tributaries of the McCloud River and Pit River which are tributaries of California's Sacramento River.  The Great Basin redband trout is found in seven distinct basins in southeastern Oregon, and parts of California and Nevada on the periphery of the Great Basin.  Redband trout have often been confused with cutthroat trout (Oncorynchus clarki).  Redband trout are prized game fish.

Throughout their distribution, the redband trout have been facing declines due to altered or destroyed habitats, introduction of exotic and hatchery-raised fish species and seasonal drought.  However, as of 2000, the population of Great Basin redband trout was not a candidate for listing as threatened or endangered by the standards established by the United States Department of the Interior Fish and Wildlife Service.

Physical characteristics
The redband trout are generally similar in appearance to the coastal rainbow trout (O. m. irideus) but have larger, more rounded spots, parr marks that tend to remain into adulthood, are more orange-red around the lateral line and have very distinct white tips on the anal, dorsal and pectoral fins. They will exceed  at maturity, which they reach within three years. The redband trout subspecies find their ideal habitat in clean, cool, relatively small and low gradient streams, but are capable of enduring higher water temperatures (75–80 °F; 24–27 °C) than other trout that may co-habit the same streams. As with other trout, they feed on insects, crustaceans and forage fish, depending on their size.

Notes

Further reading
 Behnke, R.J. 1992.  Native Trout of Western North America.  American Fisheries Society Monograph 6.  Bethesda, MD. (From the American Fisheries Society Website: This book results from almost four decades of research and practical experience with this group of fishes. This work addresses the evolution, taxonomy, and present distributions of members of this group of fishes (cutthroat, rainbow, Gila, and related indigenous troutof the West), and proposes a conservation philosophy to sustain them.)
 Muhlfield, Clint. [n.d.] Status of Redband Trout in Montana (This document, written by an agent from Montana’s Department of Fish, Wildlife and Parks and found on the website of the Montana Chapter of the American Fisheries Society, provides a concise overview of the status, characteristics, threats and management practices of the Redband trout.)
 Steens Mountain Cooperative Management and Protection Act of 2000 (Public Law 106-399).  Passed October 30, 2000.  (While not an officially designated threatened or endangered species, the Redband Trout is recognized as important resource, and this law sets aside land in Oregon for protection and research of Redband Trout.)

Oncorhynchus
Trout, Redband
Trout, Redband
Cold water fish
Fish common names